Municipio VIII is an administrative subdivision of the city of Rome.

It was first created by Rome's City Council on 11 March 2013 after the abolition of the former Municipio XI and it has a president who is elected during the mayoral elections.

Subdivision
Municipio VIII is divided into 9 localities:

Municipal Government
The President of the municipio is directly elected by citizens. The Council of the municipio is elected every five years, with a system under which voters express a direct choice for the President or an indirect choice voting for the party of the candidate's coalition. If no candidate receives at least 50% of votes, the top two candidates go to a second round after two weeks. This gives a result whereby the winning candidate may be able to claim majority support.

After the resignation of the incumbent President, a special election occurred on 10 June 2018:

Table below shows the current composition of the Council:

Here is a list of the Presidents of the municipio since the office was created in 2001 (until 2013 named Municipio XI):

Notes

References

Municipi of Rome